The 1960 Cape Grand Prix was a motor race, run to Formula Libre rules, held on 17 December 1960 at Killarney in South Africa. The race was run over 72 laps of the circuit, and was just won by British driver Stirling Moss in a Porsche 718. Jo Bonnier came in second with the fastest lap. The German driver Wolfgang von Trips was third in a Lotus.

Results

References

1960 in South African motorsport
1960 in motorsport
December 1960 sports events in Africa
Motorsport competitions in South Africa